L1, L01, L.1, L 1 or L-1 may refer to:

Mathematics, science and technology

Math 

L1 distance in mathematics, used in taxicab geometry
 L1, the space of Lebesgue integrable functions
 ℓ1, the space of absolutely convergent sequences

Science 

L1 family, a protein family of cell adhesion molecules
L1 (protein), a cell adhesion molecule
, Lagrangian point 1, the most intuitive position for an object to be gravitationally stationary relative to two larger objects (such as a satellite with respect to the Earth and Moon)
Anthranilic acid, also called vitamin L1
The first lumbar vertebra of the vertebral column in human anatomy
 The first larval stage in the Caenorhabditis elegans worm development

Technology 

L1, one of the frequencies used by GPS systems (see GPS frequencies)
L1, the common name for the Soviet space effort known formally as Soyuz 7K-L1, designed to launch men from the Earth to circle the Moon without going into lunar orbit
ISO/IEC 8859-1 (Latin-1), an 8-bit character encoding
 An L-carrier cable system developed by AT&T
 The level-1 CPU cache in a computer
Sony Xperia L1, an Android smartphone
A class of FM broadcast station in North America

Transportation and military 
 Lehrgeschwader 1, from its historic Geschwaderkennung code with the Luftwaffe in World War II
 Lufthansa Systems' IATA code
 Lawrance L-1, a predecessor of the 1920s American Lawrance J-1 aircraft engine
 Inner West Light Rail, a light rail service in Sydney, Australia, numbered L1
 L1 (New York City bus), a temporary bus route in New York City
 Volkswagen L1, a Volkswagen concept hybrid car
 L1A1 Self-Loading Rifle

Locomotives 
 Erie L-1, an American 0-8-8-0 steam locomotive class
 GCR Class 1B, latterly known as LNER Class L1, a class of British 2-6-4T steam locomotives
 GNR Class L1, latterly known as LNER Class R1, a class of British 0-8-2T steam locomotives
 LNER Thompson Class L1, a class of British 2-6-4T steam locomotives
 NCC Class L1, a Northern Counties Committee 0-6-0 class steam locomotive
 Pennsylvania Railroad class L1s, an American 2-8-2 steam locomotive class
 Soo Line L-1 class, an American 2-8-2 steam locomotive class
 SP&S Class L-1, an American 4-4-0 steam locomotive class
 SR L1 class, a class of 4-4-0 steam locomotives of Great Britain
 VR Class Vr1 (originally L1), a Finnish steam locomotive class

Aircraft 
 Arado L 1, a 1929 German two-seat parasol-wing sporting monoplane
 Macchi L.1, a 1915 Austro-Hungarian reconnaissance flying boat 
 Stinson L-1 Vigilant, the US Army Air Forces designation for the Stinson Model 74 observation aircraft

Submarines 
 USS L-1 (SS-40), a 1915 United States Navy L-class submarine
 HMS L1, a Royal Navy submarine

Other 
Ligue 1, the top division of French football
 LINE1 or L1, a transposable element in DNA
Lowest unique bid

L1, in linguistics, a subject's first language or mother tongue
L-1 Identity Solutions, a US face-recognition corporation
L-1 visa, a document used to enter the United States for the purpose of work
 L1, an abbreviation denoting someone is a Level 1 Judge, in reference to Magic: The Gathering
Bose L1 Portable Systems
 L=1, a lunar eclipse classification on the Danjon scale
 L1, the postcode for central Liverpool, a major UK city

Containing L1

ATC code L01 Antineoplastic agents, a subgroup of the Anatomical Therapeutic Chemical Classification System
Barcelona Metro line 1
DSC-L1, a 2004 Sony Cyber-shot L series camera model
Haplogroup L1 (mtDNA), a human mitochondrial haplogroup from Africa
Luxo L-1, a lamp
Panasonic Lumix DMC-L1, a 2006 single-lens reflex camera

See also
 Level 1 (disambiguation)